The Canton of Pas-en-Artois is a former canton situated in the department of the Pas-de-Calais and in the Nord-Pas-de-Calais region of northern France. It was disbanded following the French canton reorganisation which came into effect in March 2015. It consisted of 25 communes, which joined the canton of Avesnes-le-Comte in 2015. It had a total of 7,678 inhabitants (2012).

Geography 
The canton is organised around Pas-en-Artois in the arrondissement of Arras. The altitude varies from 61m (Amplier) to 172m (Humbercamps) for an average altitude of 128m.

The canton comprised 25 communes:

Amplier
Bienvillers-au-Bois
Couin
Famechon
Foncquevillers
Gaudiempré
Gommecourt
Grincourt-lès-Pas
Halloy
Hannescamps
Hébuterne
Hénu
Humbercamps
Mondicourt
Orville
Pas-en-Artois
Pommera
Pommier
Puisieux
Sailly-au-Bois
Saint-Amand
Sarton
Souastre
Thièvres
Warlincourt-lès-Pas

Population

See also
Cantons of Pas-de-Calais 
Communes of Pas-de-Calais 
Arrondissements of the Pas-de-Calais department

References

Pas-en-Artois
2015 disestablishments in France
States and territories disestablished in 2015